Trần Thu Hà, also known as Hà Trần (born August 26, 1977 in Hanoi, Vietnam) is a Vietnamese singer and producer. She is considered by the public and critics as one of the four divas in Vietnam, alongside Thanh Lam, Hồng Nhung, and Mỹ Linh.

Childhood
Hà Trần is the daughter of Trần Hiếu and Vũ Thúy Huyền. Trần Hiếu is known as a People's Artist and an opera teacher. Her mother was former Dean of Singing Department of Hanoi National Conservatory of Music and also an achievements teacher died due to cancer when she was 14. Ha Tran grew up most influenced by her brother Trần Vũ Hoàng, a painter/Dean of Fine Arts Department at Hanoi College of Arts, and her uncle – the famous songwriter and singer Trần Tiến, who she looks up as an inspirer of her music career.

Hà Trần faced many difficulties at the beginning. She did not have a strong natural voice. Many of her early critics thought she was not a distinguished talent. Her parents therefore decided to put her in a dance class at the age of six and piano lessons when she was eight years old. Despite the set-back, Hà Trần applied to learn singing with her auntie at elementary level in Hanoi College of Arts at the age of 11, and continued study to get her "Bachelor of Singing" from Hanoi National Conservatory of Music in 2000. Throughout her hard work at school, Ha started to earn many awards: Most potential voice in the contest Best Voice of Hanoi (1993); First Class of National Student Singing Festival (1994); third place at the Oriole Voice (Giọng hát Vàng Anh) held by Japan NHK Television and Horitro Productions (1995). She also won Golden Medal of National Professional Singer Award in 1995 and Best Recording Artist by Viet Nam Musician Association in the following year (1996).

In 1998, Hà Trần signed a contract with Youth Pictures (Hãng Phim Trẻ), which marked her starting point as a professional singer.

1998–2001: Em về tinh khôi (Purity) and Bài tình cho giai nhân (Love Songs For Beauty)

Hà Trần's first studio collaboration with Bằng Kiều Wake up eglantine produced by Hãng phim Trẻ (Youth Pictures) in 1998 includes songs composed by Dương Thụ, Bảo Chấn, Trần Tiến, Ngọc Châu . The album gained them both recognition throughout the country and was one of the best new artist sellers at that time.

In 1999, Youth Pictures released her debut studio album Purity, which was produced by musician Quốc Bảo.  A series of hits from this album established her pop star status such as Purity (Quốc Bảo), Lời ru cho con (Lullaby) (Xuân Phương – theme for drama of Của đề dành (Inherit)), Tóc gió thôi bay (Trần Tiến), Ngày em đến (Từ Huy) and gave her the title People of The Year among the most high-profile entertainers.

In 2000, her second solo album Love Songs For Beauty co-produced with musician Quốc Bảo, including songs: "Đêm cô đơn" (Lonely night), "Hãy yêu nhau đi" (Love to love) a duet with Diva Thanh Lam, "Dấu phố em qua", "Em về tóc xanh", "Chờ em nơi thềm trăng". Both of her albums received positive critical reception and became best-selling albums of all time under her label Youth Pictures. However, she departed from them and went freelance when the contract ended.  She continued to released other collaborations Tự họa (Self-portrait) with her uncle the famous songster Trần Tiến, which soon became another national best-selling record and opened a new chapter of her career, marking her voice with hits written by him like: "Em vẫn như ngày xưa" (Forever young), "Dòng sông mùa thu" (River and the Fall), "Phố nghèo" (Old Town), "Tóc gió thôi bay", "Sắc màu" (Colors), "Chị tôi" (My sister), "Thành phố trẻ" (City of the Youth).

In April, Hà's live performance in FM Blue Wave Awards made the song "Colors" a mega hit.  She was voted Top 10 Singers by radio program of FM Làn sóng xanh (Blue Wave Awards) from 1998 to 2001 and also won the title "Most Favorite Singer" of Mai Vàng (Golden Orchid Awards), 2000. Later that year Ha Tran took part with many household names in a live concert Chiều Hà Nội (Hanoi evening) created by musician Vũ Quang Trung to promote their previous jazz collaborations. Lullaby for Your Eyes (1999) features saxophonist Trần Mạnh Tuấn. Many songs were performed by Ha Tran like: "Tiếng mưa", "Lời cuối tình yêu", "Anh yêu em" drew the fans' interest and expanded her influence as a multi-style soloist.

During 1998–2001, Hà Trần participated in many other collaborations: Môi hồng đào 1,2,3 (Red lips); Nghe mưa 2 (Listen to the rain) (with songs composed by Bảo Chấn and Dương Thụ), Thanh Tùng Love songs 1 & 2, Vừa biết dấu yêu (Puberty), series of Quốc Bảo's albums (Ngồi hát ca bềnh bồng, Vàng son) and featured in many popular concert shows such as Duyên dáng Việt Nam, Đồng Vọng Bốn Mùa, Dòng thời gian, Mai Vàng Awards, etc.

2001–02: Nhật thực (Solar eclipse)

In 2002, Hà Trần and musician Ngọc Đại held Nhật thực (Solar eclipse) live show throughout Vietnam to introduce the same album – Nhật thực. The live show was designed with all songs written by Ngọc Đại and lyrics from poems of Vi Thùy Linh. Besides, this show was also contributed by composer Đỗ Bảo, singers Minh Anh – Minh Ánh (2M band), choreographer Quỳnh Lan, vision director Việt Tú and the stage decorator Trần Vũ Hoàng (Hà's brother).

"Nhat thuc" faced with a burden of troubles with its commencement. There was a scandal of copyright dispute between Ha and Hồng Nhung in respect of song- "Det tam gai" (Weaving Tam Gai), Ngoc Dai then stopped Hong Nhung to perform this song. However, in December 2001, Nhật thực was hindered by the Performance Administration because the lyrics was so "sexy" that they may "cause bad effects to the culture and ethic of Vietnamese music" (said Mr. Lê Nam – Director of the Administration). Therefore, the album was delayed to remove and amend its lyrics; 2 songs – "Tự Tình" and "Mơ" (Dreaming) used to be the starting songs in this concept album with marvelous melody were removed; the lyrics of 2 songs "Cây nữ tu" and "Đừng hát tình ca du mục nữa" (Don't sing the nomad's love song) .

After settling the above matters, the show took place in April 2002, and then Nhật thực album was also public in May. Nhật thực album includes 7 songs: "Nghi ngại" (Shadow of doubt), "Đừng hát tình ca du mục nữa" (Don't sing the nomad's love song), "Phía ngày nắng tắt" (Other side of sunset), "Dệt tầm gai" (Weaving Tam Gai), "Tiếc nuối" (Regret), "Ảo ảnh" (Illusion), "Nhật thực" (Solar eclipse). The two songs "Mơ" (Dreaming) and "Tự tình" were removed, the album with 9 songs became 7 songs album, song of "Cây nữ tu" was changed under new name of "Ảo ảnh". Nhật thực was one concept album, with a completed story. 7 songs expressed 7 stories told by a girl in love with her desperation, doubt, regret and obsession.

Right after release, Nhật thực made a shock to Vietnam's music with its strange and new trend, including lyrics, melody, performance art and arrangement. This show became a special music event and was voted by presses as one of the cultural phenomenon of 2002, a great landmark of innovation in music original style and performance in Vietnam. In additions, the existence of Nhật thực oriented the music audiences in Vietnam to be interested in music harmony, arrangement and mix of an album. Nhật thực was also an important step in the career of Ha Tran, causing prominent development of her style: Stronger, Special and Diversity. As from Nhật thực, Ha was called as one of 4 divas of Vietnamese music.

Nevertheless, after success of the first show, the dispute arose among the members of the show, Ngọc Đại – Trần Thu Hà – Vi Thuỳ Linh. As a result, after Nhật thực 1, Trần Thu Hà announced on the press that she quit Nhat thuc. Ngọc Đại continued with his own Nhật thực 2 in 2003, without Ha Tran and Vi Thuỳ Linh, but there were many stars of Vietnam such as: Thanh Lam, Hồ Quỳnh Hương, Linh Dung, Tùng Dương, Khánh Linh, Ngọc Khuê… However, "Nhat Thuc 2" live concert and the album (sold at special price of VND 6000, equal to about USD 0.5) did not get any success as the first one.

2002–04: Thanh Lam – Hà Trần

In October 2002, Hà Trần and Mỹ Linh went to San Jose, California, USA for a charity show. The show was held by Vnhelp to raise a fund for the poor students. Ha Tran not only performed her hits but also sang many prewar songs, such as "Yêu" (To love) (Văn Phụng), "Hương xưa" (Memory of Incense) (Cung Tiến)... At the same time, a famous rock band of Vietnam The Wall noted that they would only invite Hà Trần in their show but she could not participate.

November 2002, Ha had her great performance with Ian Shaw in the special show held by British Council. She suddenly inspired and filled in with several folk songs with Ian Shaw.

In 2003, her voice appeared in the album vol.3 of Quoc Bao – Bình yên (Peaceful) with the songs: "Bình yên, Gió" (Windy), "Tình ca" (Love Song), "Là yêu chưa từng yêu" (To love as the beginner), "Tình ơi" (Dearest). "Bình yên" a duet song with her father – Trần Hiếu – received many supports and good complements from the audience. Her voice in the song of "Là yêu chưa từng yêu" was taken in to Hotel Vietnam album of Japanese musician, Makoto Katoba.

In April 2003, she suddenly appeared in the second live show of The Wall band with the song "Khám phá" (Discovery) as a female rocker.

In August 2003, she was invited as a judge of Sao Mai Singers’ Contest (former name: National Music Festival of VTV) when she was only 26, the youngest judge in the history of this national music contest.

In October 2003, Ha held a live show in the series of Âm nhạc và những người bạn (Music and friends show) with theme of Colors. This show was supported by Vietnam Television and live broadcast on VTV3 channel with the participation of Ha's friends: Trần Hiếu, Trần Tiến, Thanh Lam, Phương Thanh, Nguyễn Ngọc Ánh, 5 Dòng Kẻ, etc.

In 2004, Ha cooperate with her closed friend, Diva Thanh Lam, to release the album Thanh Lam – Hà Trần. The album included songs written by Trịnh Công Sơn, Thuận Yến, Kim Ngọc, Niels Lan Doky, Lê Minh Sơn and Thanh Lam (Thanh Lam wrote some songs for this album). Most of songs in this album were duet, Ha Tran had 3 solo songs "Sao đổi ngôi" (Kim Ngọc), "Chạy trốn" (Lê Minh Sơn) and "Trái tim lang thang" (Thanh Lam). At the same time, Ha also participated in Nghiêng nghiêng rừng chiều album of Nguyễn Cường with 2 songs "Cho tình yêu bay lên bồng bềnh" and "Để em mơ".

In October 2004, Ha Tran participated in the Lời của giòng sông – Trịnh Công Sơn and guitar. The album included 5 classic solo guitar song and 8 songs with singer and guitar, in which Hà Trần sang 4 Tình xa, Tình nhớ, Mưa hồng, Xin trả nợ người.

Ha got married in 2004 with an Oversea Vietnamese in the United States. Then, she moved to the United States with her husband.

2004–05: Hà Trần 98-03

Since moving to the United States, Ha coordinated with Thúy Nga and had some performances in Paris By Night.

In 2005, Ha release Hà Trần 98-03. The album included hits of Ha Tran from 1998 to 2003 which were remixed: Mùa xuân gọi, Phố nghèo, Dòng sông mùa thu, Sắc màu, Chuyện tình thảo nguyên (Trần Tiến), Lời chưa nói (Xuân Phương –  theme of drama Phía trước là bầu trời), Mưa tháng giêng (Việt Hùng – Nguyễn Việt Chiến), Tình ca, Em về tóc xanh, Em về tinh khôi (Quốc Bảo), Hoa gạo (Ngọc Đại – Phan Huyền Thư)... The album was also released in the USA under name of Sắc màu – Tình ca by Thúy Nga and was added a song Tiến thoài lưỡng nan. The album has 3 tracks recorded with some American musicians in 510 Studios, Fremont, California.

In July 2005, she performed in Miss Vietnamese USA Contest. In 11/2005, Ha came back Vietnam to perform as main actress in the musical Mythology Night dedicated to Trinh Cong Son by Phuong Nam Film. She sang three songs: Nắng thuỷ tinh (duet with Quang Dũng), Lời thiên thu gọi, Tự tình khúc (with 5 Dòng kẻ).

2006: Communication 06

In September 2006, Ha released the 5th album Communication 06 (Đối thoại 06). This album was the first album produced by Hà Trần Productions (a company found by Ha Tran since 2005) implemented with her coordinators: musician Trần Tiến, Nguyễn Xinh Xô, Thanh Phương, Ben Doan (her husband), and 2 American sound engineers John Vestman and Max Neutra. The album was recorded at Kingkong Music Group (North Hollywood), Sound Matrix and Vestman Studio in Orange County, California and was published by Viết Tân Studio.  The album was also released in the USA, and was sale on some website, such as CD Baby, Amazon, Target.

Communication 06 deemed to be the conversations between Eastern music (Vietnam) and Western music (The USA), between 2 musician generations Nguyễn Xinh Xô and Trần Tiến. The album was an indie album and subjected to genre of ambient/trip hop/electronic, including songs of Trần Tiến (Ra ngõ mà yêu, Bình nguyên xa vắng, Mưa bay tháp cổ, Lữ khách sông Hồng and Quê nhà) and Nguyễn Xinh Xô (Giấc mơ lạ, Nước sâu). Besides album had 3 instrumentals: Tiếng gọi (The Calling) by Ben Doan & Hà Trần, outro Quê nhà(Nolstagia) by Thanh Phương and Without by Ben Doan & Ha Tran.

After release, the album caused many debates and controversies in Vietnam on the value of such music. The album also drew the interest of both audiences and music critics with different comments. For all that, Hà Trần won the pride for the Best Album of Cống Hiến Contribution Awards (Culture and Sport Newspaper).

Beside album Communication 06, Ha also dedicated some songs for album of Van Tuan Anh -Giao khúc biển cả và núi đồi.

2007: Tình ca qua thế kỷ (Century of love songs)

In 2007, Ha participated in Paris By Night 90, 88, 86, 85, 84, 83, 82, 78. She had 2 duet song with Bằng Kiều in his album – Vá lại tình tôi: Bây giờ tháng mấy (Từ Công Phụng) and Cho quên thu đau thương (Main dans la main). She acted as judge again in the PBN Talent Show. Hà also participated in the debut album of new singer Hòa Trần by duet song Lời ru cho con (Lullaby) (Xuân Phương). Ha Tran, Thanh Lam and Tùng Dương also performed in the album of musician Trần Viết Tân – Biệt.

In July 2007, Ha Tran production cooperated with Thúy Nga to release album Tình ca qua thế kỷ (century of love songs). This album included prewar songs of Từ Công Phụng, Ngọc Bích, Đức Huy, Tùng Giang, Trịnh Công Sơn, Đoàn Chuẩn, Ngô Thụy Miên, Nguyễn Ánh 9, arranged by Thanh Phương, Nguyễn Xinh Xô, Nguyễn Nhân, Shane Barber. The album had some records of live performance in Paris By Night: Tình khúc tháng 6 and Đường xa ướt mưa – duet with Bằng Kiều (PBN82), Cô đơn – Nguyễn Ánh 9 (PBN83), Giọt lệ thiên thu – duet with Khánh Ly, guitar Thanh Phương (PBN84). Especially, Cô đơn (Alone) was her great performance and musician Nguyễn Ánh 9 considered Ha Tran as greatest voice for this song. However, this album was only published in the USA because of some political issues.

2008: Trần Tiến

In 2008, Hà Trần Production released album the first musician's album Trần Tiến. Beside Hà Trần, the album was also contributed by Tùng Dương, Hòa T. Trần and David Trần. This album also expressed the maturity of Ha Tran's voice, sweet, feeling and sophistical and showed a different master picture of Trần Tiến. In this album Hà Trần skillfully used her voice as an instrument, she sang as she talked, naturally and balance in emotion. Album Trần Tiến was arranged with the concept of colors, theme and style of Trần Tiến.

In September 2008, Ha participated in her close friend's album Đỗ Bảo Thời gian để yêu. The songs "Bài ca tháng 6" (Song for June) and "Câu trả lời" (The answer) were not catch-ear songs but they suddenly inspired Vietnamese audience right after release. Song for June was her perfect performance and was considered by Đỗ Bảo as the mutual understanding between the songwriter and singer. At the end of 2008, Hà perform her dancing and singing in PBN95 with song Ra ngõ mà yêu (Leaving the alley).

In March 2009, album Tran Tien was nominated for 2008 Best Album of Cong Hien Contribution Awards (Culture and Sport Newspaper).  Voting was done by music critics and newspapers/magazines in Vietnam.  Tran Tien lost by 6 votes to first-place winner Do Bao album Thoi gian de yeu.

2009–10: Minimal Beast

In 2009, Hà continued performing in some productions by Thúy Nga Paris By Night and travelled to Vietnam for several shows, including "Khúc giao mùa", "Bóng ai qua thềm", "Duyên Dáng Việt Nam 21", etc.  She also found time to work on some new material and collaborated with electronic project Whodat (www.myspace.com/whodatmusic) by co-producing and singing 4 songs in English and Vietnamese.  The result was a collective album called Minimal Beasts, and in December 2009, the first single Stroma won the people's choice prize of Bài Hát Việt show in Vietnam.  This song was dedicated for the love of nature, describe the relationship between human being and the earth.  Ha Tran Productions released Minimal Beasts in the U.S. in March 2010.

2012–13: Đỗ Bảo – Hà Trần: Chuyện của Mặt Trời, Chuyện của Chúng ta
Đỗ Bảo – Hà Trần: Chuyện của Mặt Trời, Chuyện của Chúng Ta released in 2013 and garnered critical acclaim. The first impression of 2000 CDs were sold out within three days of its release (2000 CDs is considered a great number and success due to common piracy problem in Vietnam). The album was produced over a period of 18 months via telecommunication with Do Bao in Ha Noi, Vietnam and Tran Thu Ha in Southern California, USA. The post-production took 10 days at a full-fledged studio in Boston. Some of fans' favorite are: Chuyện tôi yêu, Đôi Giày Lười, Thời gian để yêu, Kế Hoạch Làm Bạn, and Bài Ca Cây Đàn. In December 2013, Đỗ Bảo & Hà Trần organized a few concerts in Hanoi and Ho Chi Minh City with great success. In January 2014, Đỗ Bảo – Hà Trần: Chuyện của Mặt Trời, Chuyện của Chúng ta was nominated for 4 Cống Hiến Awards, including Album of The Year, Singer of The Year, Concert of the Year, and Composer of the Year. The awards will take place on April 22, 2014 in Hanoi.

Awards
 Album Tran Tien received second place category the Best Album of Contribution Awards, 2008.
 Album Communication 06 won the Best Album of Contribution Awards in 2006 and Top 10 Albums by Labor Newspaper and Album of the year on Nhacso.net dedicated by online viewers, 2006.
 Album Nhật Thực (Solar Eclipse) with Ngọc Đại, Đỗ Bảo and Vi Thùy Linh was voted as cultural phenomenon by National Newspapers, 2002.
 Most favorite singer of Mai Vang Awards (Golden Orchid Awards), 2000.
 Top 10 Vietnamese Singers since 1998 by FM Radio South Vietnam.
 Most Favorite Television Performer by Hanoi Broadcast Center, 1997
 Best Recording Artist by Vietnam Musician Association, 1996.
 Gold Medal of National Professional Voices, 1995.
 Third Place of the Oriole Singer "Tiếng hát Vàng Anh" held by Japan Television NHK and Horitro Productions, 1995.
 First Class of National Student Voices Festival, 1994.
 Most Potential Face of Hanoi Best New Voice, 1993.

Albums

Solo albums 

 To the Core (2016)
 Timeless Classics Vol. 2 (2014)
 Timeless Classics (2007) – Only in the USA
 Communication 06 (2006)
 Hà Trần 98-03 (in Vietnam) and Sắc Màu – Love songs (in the USA) (2005)
 Eclipse (2002)
 Songs for Beauty (2000)
 Purity (1999)

Collaborations
 Giang Sol's album Shadow of Jazz (2015)
 Longbow 3: Chuyện của Mặt Trời, Chuyện của Chúng Ta (2013)
 Đỗ Bảo's second album Thời Gian Để Yêu (2008)
 Trần Tiến (2008)
 Đỗ Bảo's first album Cánh Cung (2004)
 Thanh Lam – Hà Trần (2004)
 Lời Ru Mắt Em – with Vũ Quang Trung and Trần Mạnh Tuấn (2001)
 Self Portrait – with Trần Tiến (2000)
 Dòng Sông Lơ Đãng – with Bằng Kiều (1998)
 Featured in 3 Quoc Bao's album Bình Yên (Peaceful 2002), Vàng Son (2000), Ngồi Ca Hát Bềnh Bồng (1999) and many more....

References

External links
 Trang web của Hà Trần
 Trần Thu Hà tại MySpace
 Trang chủ của Hà Trần Production
 Trần Thu Hà – Wikipedia tiếng Việt

People from Hanoi
20th-century Vietnamese women singers
1977 births
Living people
21st-century Vietnamese women singers